All Melody is the ninth studio album by German musician Nils Frahm. It was released in January 2018 under Erased Tapes Records.

Critical reception

Accolades

Track listing

Charts

Weekly charts

Year-end charts

References

2018 albums
Nils Frahm albums
Erased Tapes Records albums